The Club is an American reality television series about the competitive and cutthroat world of ICE, a stand-alone nightclub in Las Vegas. The series aired on Spike TV from 2004 to 2005.

Overview
The show was an insiders look at the pressures and demands the people behind the party face in making ICE the ultimate nightlife experience. It featured appearances from DJs as Donald Glaude, Paul Oakenfold, DJ Dan, Tiesto and Armin Van Buuren. It also featured a Heineken sponsored DJ contest featuring LadyHouse, DJ Tatiana, DJ Diamond and LoveJules judged by Paul Oakenfold and Colleen Shannon. DJ ROCKIT, the selected winner of the contest opened up for Sandra Collins and Paul Oakenfold.

References

External links
 

2000s American reality television series
2004 American television series debuts
2005 American television series endings